Sam Coghlan Murray (born 31 January 1992) is an Irish former rugby union player for Nottingham. His preferred position was on the wing. He made his senior debut for Leinster in February 2014 against Zebre. It was announced in May 2014 that he would be promoted from the academy to the Leinster senior squad for the season commencing 2014-15.

1992 births
Living people
Leinster Rugby players
Irish rugby union players
People educated at Newbridge College
Rugby union wings